The 2nd constituency of the Côte-d'Or is a French legislative constituency in the Côte-d'Or département. Like the other 576 French constituencies, it elects one MP using the two-round system.

Description

Côte-d'Or's 2nd constituency covers the centre and east of Dijon as well as the rural areas to the east of the city.

The seat was held by Gaullist parties from 1988 to 2022, when it was won by LREM. The seat was taken by Jean-Marc Nudant in 1998 following the appointment of his predecessor Louis de Broissia to the Senate.

Historic Representation

Election results

2022 

 
 
|-
| colspan="8" bgcolor="#E9E9E9"|
|-
 
 

 
 
 
 
 

* David stood as an LR dissident without the support of the party or the UDC alliance.

2017

2012

Sources

Official results of French elections from 2002: "Résultats électoraux officiels en France" (in French).

References

2